Eggi or Eggen is a mountain in Vågå Municipality in Innlandet county, Norway. The mountain is surrounded by several other notable mountains including Bukkehåmåren to the east, Høgdebrotet to the southeast, Tjønnholstinden to the south, Skarvflytindene to the southwest, Surtningssue to the northwest, and Besshø and Besseggen to the northeast.

See also
List of mountains of Norway by height

References

Jotunheimen
Vågå
Mountains of Innlandet